The Last Hangover is a Brazilian comedy streaming television special  produced by the comedy troupe Porta dos Fundos. It was released by Netflix on December 21, 2018.

Plot
The participants of The Last Supper had a night of drunkenness and Jesus Christ disappeared. The apostles then need to find him and unravel what happened the night before.

Cast and characters 
 Fábio Porchat	as	Jesus
 Gregório Duvivier	as	Judas
 Antonio Tabet	as	Thomas
 Pedro Benevides	as	Simon
 Paulo Vieira	as	Peter
 Rafael Portugal	as	Diego
 Fábio de Luca	as	Bartolomeu
 Karina Ramil	as	Mary Magdalene
 Evelyn Castro	as	Kenia
 Pedro Monteiro	as	James I
 Camillo Borges	as	James II
 Gabriel Totoro	as	Roman Guard #1
 Victor Leal	as	Roman Guard #2

Reception
At the 47th International Emmy Awards, the film was awarded Best Comedy.

See also
 The First Temptation of Christ (2018)

References

External links 
 
 The Last Hangover at Rotten Tomatoes
 

2018 television films
Brazilian television films
Brazilian comedy films
Brazilian television specials
Brazilian satirical films
International Emmy Award for best comedy series winners
Portrayals of Jesus in film
2010s Portuguese-language films
Netflix specials
Films based on the Bible
Religious satire films
2018 films
2018 comedy films